Ankara Music and Fine Arts University is a public university in Ankara, Turkey. It was established on 1 July 2017. The university continues its education with 4 Faculties, 1 institute and 1 vocational school. Ankara Music and Fine Arts University is Turkey's first higher education institution with a full focus on music.

History 
Ankara Music and Fine Arts University was founded with the Law No. 7033 published in the Official Gazette of the Republic of Turkey numbered 3011 on 1 July 2017.

Academics

Institutes 
Institute of Music and Fine Arts

Faculties 

 Faculty of Music Sciences and Technologies
 Faculty of Performing Arts
 Faculty of Music and Fine Arts Education
 Faculty of Art and Design

Vocational schools 

 Vocational School of Music and Fine Arts

Campus 
The university campus located in Oran, Çankaya district, is established on a closed area of 23600 m2 and has a total area of 54462 m2. There is a guesthouse with a total usage area of 16741 m2 in the university campus. There are two refectory, one 4-storey library and one cafeteria on the campus.

References 

Universities and colleges in Turkey
Educational institutions established in 2017
Buildings and structures in Ankara
2017 establishments in Turkey